Petar Mrkonjić (before 1645 – after 1669) was a legendary hajduk from the Imotski region in the Dalmatian Hinterland, in modern-day Croatia, active during the Cretan War (1645–1669) between the Republic of Venice and Ottoman Empire as a guerrilla leader serving Venice.

History

Vuk Stefanović Karadžić had found no historical documents on Petar Mrkonjić.  Folklorist Stjepan Grčić did not believe Petar Mrkonjić was a historical figure.

According to Anđelko Mijatović, it is generally believed that the epic personality of Petar Mrkonjić is a historical figure, and that he was born in Imotski; he is possibly the same person as Petar Imoćanin ("Petar from Imotski"), who lived in the mid-17th century and is said to have greatly damaged properties of the Republic of Ragusa, after which the Ragusans urged the Venetians to stop him, as he was a Venetian subject.

Legacy
Mrkonjić has become the subject of poems and Croatian patriotic songs. One of the earliest mentions of Mrkonjić were written by the Venetian-Croatian friar and poet Andrija Kačić Miošić (1704-1760) in Vitezovi Imotske krajine.

In Serbian epic poetry, he has a hero status along with other hajduks such as Starac Vujadin, Pecija, Golub, Starina Novak, Bajo Pivljanin, and others. He is also the subject of a poem by Serbian linguist Vuk Stefanović Karadžić (1787-1864) in Jaut-beg i Pero Mrkonjić.

During the Great Eastern Crisis, set off by a Serb uprising against the Ottoman Empire in 1875 in Bosnia and Herzegovina (Herzegovina Uprising (1875–77)), Prince Peter adopted the nom de guerre of hajduk Petar Mrkonjić of Ragusa, and joined the Bosnian Serb insurgents as a leader of a guerilla unit. In 1925 the "Organization of Serbian Chetniks - Petar Mrkonjić" was founded, though it was banned by King Alexander I of Yugoslavia four years later when he instituted a dictatorship. In World War II, there was a Chetnik command named "Petar Mrkonjić", with 700 fighters. Babić formed the paramilitary Petar Mrkonjić-brigade in April 1992. The "Medal of Petar Mrkonjić" was also given by Republika Srpska.

References

17th-century Croatian people
17th-century Croatian military personnel
Republic of Venice military personnel
Year of death unknown
Year of birth unknown
Characters in Serbian epic poetry